Ahmed Abdel-Raouf (born 12 April 1986) is an Egyptian professional footballer who currently plays as a midfielder for Telephonat Bani Sweif.

Career
Abdel-Raouf currently plays as a central midfielder. He is a graduate of the Zamalek youth academy.

In July 2010, Abdel-Raouf transferred to the newly promoted side Misr Lel Makasa (MCSD), signing a two-year contract.

Honors
Zamalek
Egyptian Cup (2008)

References

1986 births
Living people
Egyptian footballers
Zamalek SC players
Egyptian Premier League players
Association football midfielders